The Kids Are Alright 2 (or simply ) is a Spanish comedy film directed by  and written by Marta González de Vega and Santiago Segura. It is a sequel to The Kids Are Alright. It features Paz Vega, Paz Padilla, Santiago Segura, and Leo Harlem alongside a children cast.

Plot 
Upon Ricardo and Felipe's sloppy children oversight in the events of The Kids Are Alright, Clara does not trust them this time, so she takes the kids by herself (together with friend Susana) to the summer camp.

Cast

Production 
The film is a sequel to Santiago Segura's box office hit The Kids Are Alright (2021), with  taking over direction duties in her sophomore feature after . It was written by Santiago Segura and Marta González de Vega. It is a Bowfinger International Pictures, Atresmedia Cine and A todo tren 2 LP AIE production, with the participation of Atresmedia, and Movistar Plus+, and in association with Mogambo and Latido Films. Shooting locations included Madrid, the Region of Murcia (including Águilas), and the provinces of Segovia and Toledo.

Release 
The film was theatrically released in Spain on 2 December 2022.

See also 
 List of Spanish films of 2022

References

External links 
 A todo tren 2 at ICAA's Catálogo de Cinespañol

Bowfinger International Pictures films
Atresmedia Cine films
Spanish comedy films
Spanish sequel films
Films scored by Roque Baños
Films shot in Madrid
Films shot in the Region of Murcia
Films shot in the province of Toledo
Films shot in the province of Segovia